Odd Solumsmoen (6 June 1917 – 30 April 1986) was a Norwegian novelist and literary critic.

Biography
Solumsmoen was born at Hamar in Hedmark, Norway. His parents were Torger Solumsmoen (1886-1923) and Mathilde Gren (1885-1967). His father died when he was only six years old. He graduated in 1939 from Hamar Cathedral School. He became a regular contributor to Arbeiderbladet  from the early 1950s  until the 1980s.

He debuted as a fictional author in 1943 with the novel Barn i søndagsskolen. The book attracted considerable attention in his hometown since the stories so clearly started from recognizable events and models. His later works also had an autobiographical starting point. Solumsmoen's biographic works include a monograph on  writer and painter  Cora Sandel (Cora Sandel. En dikter i ånd og sannhet, 1957)  and on  poet and author Kristofer Uppdal (Kristofer Uppdal – domkirkebyggeren, 1959). Both are characterized by the personalization of the two authors. Among his other works  was the novel Hjem, kjære hjem from 1955. Solumsmoen was awarded the Mads Wiel Nygaards Endowment in 1972.

References

1917 births
1986 deaths
People from Hamar
20th-century Norwegian novelists
20th-century Norwegian poets
Norwegian male poets
20th-century Norwegian dramatists and playwrights
Norwegian male novelists
Norwegian male dramatists and playwrights
20th-century Norwegian male writers